Jeffrey J. Selingo (born 28 January 1973) is an American author and journalist. He wrote There Is Life After College: What Parents and Students Should Know About Navigating School to Prepare for the Jobs of Tomorrow, Who Gets In and Why: A Year Inside College Admission, and College (Un)Bound: The Future of Higher Education and What It Means for Students. From 2007 to 2011, he was the editor of The Chronicle of Higher Education.

Early life and education 
Selingo grew up near Wilkes-Barre, Pa. He obtained a bachelor's degree in journalism from Ithaca College, in 1995. In 2001, he received his master's degree in government from the Johns Hopkins University.

Career 
After graduating from college, Selingo worked as a reporter at the Ithaca Journal, The Arizona Republic, and the Wilmington (NC) Star-News. He started as a reporter at The Chronicle of Higher Education in 1997, and then worked in numerous editing roles until becoming the top editor in 2007.

Publications 
In Who Gets In and Why: A Year Inside College Admission, Selingo observed the selection process at three schools, Emory University, the University of Washington, and Davidson College. In the Wall Street Journal review, Naomi Schaefer Riley wrote that Selingo, “has an ear for dialogue and an eye for detail.” The reviewer said: “As compelling as ‘Who Gets In and Why’ is for disinterested observers, parents of high-school students will especially value (or desperately flip to) the sections where Mr. Selingo offers an inside view of the admissions process."

Notes 

Living people
1973 births
21st-century American writers
21st-century American journalists
Ithaca College alumni